Jeffrey Cheah Fook Ling (born 1945 or 1946) is the founder and current chairman of the Sunway Group, a Malaysian conglomerate operating in 12 industries with core businesses in property and construction. Jeffrey Cheah is Foundation Chancellor of Sunway University in Malaysia. He is also a Founding Trustee of the Jeffrey Cheah Foundation.

Cheah is the recipient of 10 honorary doctorates, most of which in recognition of his outstanding contribution towards education.

Jeffrey Cheah moved to Australia to pursue a business degree at Victoria University (then Footscray Institute of Technology) in Melbourne and after graduating, returned to Malaysia to take a job as an accountant in a motor assembly plant. He soon left this employment, and in 1974, he started his own company, a small tin-mining company with a startup capital of RM100,000. Today, Sunway Group is one of Malaysia's most formidable property-construction conglomerate.

Through his eponymous foundation, Cheah has donated almost US$39 million to fund scholarships and educational causes since 2018.

Sunway Group and Bandar Sunway 
The Sunway Group grew from a gradual conglomeration of Jeffrey Cheah's business interests. At its heart is the  development Bandar Sunway (Sunway City), a township in the Petaling district of the state of Selangor.

The development of Sunway City has won the township international awards, including recognition as Malaysia's first fully integrated green townshipby the Green Building Index (GBI) of Malaysia. Sunway City (formerly known as Sunway Resort City) also received the Low Carbon City award from the Malaysian Institute of Planners for implementing low carbon initiatives within the township.

Educational investment 
In 1987, Jeffrey Cheah established Sunway College in Bandar Sunway as a private tertiary educational institute. Cheah partnered with Monash University in Melbourne, Australia in order to enable Malaysian students to pursue a preparatory year at Sunway College before being admitted to study at Monash. In 1997, the college proved financially viable, and Cheah transferred ownership to the Sunway Educational Trust Fund. In 1998, the Monash University Malaysia Campus was opened in Bandar Sunway, in partnership with the trust fund. On 12 August 2004, the Minister for Education granted the institution the status of a university college. In 2005 Monash University established the Jeffrey Cheah School of Medicine and Health Sciences (JCSMHS). The school offers first and second degrees in several departments of medicine and psychology and is accredited by the Australian Medical Council (AMC). In 2006, the Sultan of Selangor installed Jeffrey Cheah as Foundation Chancellor of the university college.

In 2001, the Royal Malaysia Police, Malaysia Crime Prevention Foundation (MCPF), the Selangor State Government and the Sunway Group, launched a joint initiative called the Safe City Initiative in order to reduce crime in the area. The initiative was deemed a success. In recognition of Tan Sri Jeffrey's contribution in the field of social safety and security, he was appointed the Chairman of MCPF Selangor Chapter by the Minister of Unity, Culture, Arts & Heritage in Aug 2008.

Awards, honors and privileged positions

Royal orders and conferments 
On 8 March 1988, the Sultan of Selangor made Jeffrey Cheah a Knight Commander of the Crown of Selangor (DPMS), which entitles its holder to the title Dato'.

In 1995, Jeffrey Cheah was made a Justice of the Peace (JP) by the Sultan of Terengganu. The appointment is purely honorary.

In April 1996, the Sultan of Perak, Jeffrey Cheah's home state, made him a Knight Grand Commander of the Crown of Perak (SPMP), which entitles its holder to the title Dato' Seri.

On 1 June 1996, Yang di-Pertuan Agong (the 'King of Malaysia') awarded Cheah Commander of the Order of Loyalty of the Crown of Malaysia (PSM), which entitles its holder to the title Tan Sri.

On 10 July 2008, Jeffrey Cheah was made an Honorary Officer of the Order of Australia (AO) for "service to Australia–Malaysia bilateral relations, particularly tertiary education through the development of collaborative student transfer programs and the establishment of a Monash University campus in Malaysia".

Honorary doctorates 
Jeffrey Cheah has been awarded the following ten honorary doctorates, by universities in Australia, the United States, United Kingdom and Malaysia.

Government advisor positions 
 Director, National Productivity Centre, appointed by the Minister of Trade (1990).
 Chairman, Malaysian Industry-Government High Technology for Construction and Housing (MIGHT), appointed by the Prime Minister (1995).
 Executive Council Member, Malaysian Tourism Action Council, appointed by the Minister of Tourism (1996).
 Council Member, Higher Education Council of Malaysia, appointed by the Minister of Education (1996).
 Council Member, Financial Reporting Foundation, appointed by the Minister of Finance (1997).

Business honours 
 'Property Man of the Year (FIABCI, Malaysian Chapter)' (1993).
 'CEO of the Year (Malaysia)' (1996).
 'Asia's Most Innovative Chinese Entrepreneur Award' (2005).
 Chairman & co-founder of Asian Strategy And Leadership Institute (ASLI).
 Paul Harris Fellow Award.
 Fellow Australian Society of Certificate Practising Accountants.
 Fellow of Institute of Directors.
 Lifetime Achievement Luminary Award (2016)

Social and welfare organisations 
 President, Malaysian Hakka Association (1997).
 Founding Trustee, Malaysian Liver Foundation (1999).
 Honorary chairman, Sin Chew Foundation (2000).
 Vice-President, National Kidney Foundation of Malaysia (2002).
 Honorary Member, Kuala Lumpur Malay Chamber of Commerce (2002).
 Fellow Benefactor, University of Cambridge (2015).

Places named after Jeffrey Cheah 
 Jeffrey Cheah Institute on Southeast Asia, Sunway University
 Jeffrey Cheah School of Medicine and Health Sciences, Monash University Malaysia Campus
 Jeffrey Cheah Hall, Level 4, Sunway College
 Kompleks Tan Sri Jeffrey Cheah, SJK (C) Chee Wen, Selangor
 Jeffrey Cheah Biomedical Centre, University of Cambridge

References

Living people
Malaysian businesspeople
Malaysian people of Hakka descent
People from Dongguan
People from Perak
Honorary Officers of the Order of Australia
Victoria University, Melbourne alumni
Sunway Group
Commanders of the Order of Loyalty to the Crown of Malaysia
Year of birth missing (living people)